The Sponsio Academica is the oath taken by all students matriculating into the four ancient Scottish universities. Traditionally the oath was given orally in Latin but it is now appended to the matriculation form signed by each student. Each student who takes the oath promises that they have put themselves under the authority of the Senatus Academicus of their particular institution.

At the University of St Andrews the following oath is taken.

At the University of Glasgow the following oath is taken:

At the University of Edinburgh the following oath is taken:

References 

Ancient universities of Scotland
Latin words and phrases